In Greek mythology, Idas, was a Messenian prince. He was one of the  Argonauts, a participant in the hunt for the Calydonian Boar and contender with the gods. Idas was described as keen and spirited.

Family 
Idas was the son of Aphareus and Arene and the elder brother of Lynceus and Pisus. He was sometimes regarded as the offspring of Poseidon. In some accounts, the wife of Aphareus and thus, Idas' possible mother was named as Polydora or Laocoosa. By Marpessa, Idas had one daughter named Cleopatra Alcyone who married Meleager.

Mythology

Contest for Marpessa's hand 
When Idas came from Messenia to ask for the hand of Marpessa, daughter of Evenus. The maiden's father refused his request because he wanted his daughter to remain a virgin. Idas went to his father Poseidon and begged for the use of a winged chariot. Poseidon consented to his use of the chariot, and Idas stole Marpessa away from a band of dancers and fled to Pleuron in Aetolia. Her father, after chasing the couple for a long time and realizing he could not catch up to them, killed his horses and then drowned himself in a nearby river Lycormas and became immortal. The river was named later after him.

Apollo also pursued them in his own chariot, wanting Marpessa for himself.Idas that was mightiest of men that were then upon the face of earth;who also took his bow to face the king Phoebus Apollofor the sake of the fair-ankled maid [i.e. Marpessa].As the two fought for the girl's hand, Zeus eventually intervened and commanded Marpessa to choose between her mortal lover and the god. Marpessa chose Idas, reasoning to Apollo that had she chosen the god, she would have eventually grown old and lost his affections:
And thou beautiful god, in that far time,When in thy setting sweet thou gazest downOn this grey head, wilt thou remember thenThat once I pleased thee, that I once was young?

Fight with the Dioscuri

Hyginus version 
The two beautiful daughters of Leucippus, Phoebe and Hilaeira were promised brides of their cousins, Idas and Lynceus. Because of their beauty, the twins Castor and Pollux who were inflamed with love, carried off the maidens. Trying to recover their lost brides-to-be, the two Messenian princes, took to arms and joined the celebrated fight between them and their rival suitors. During the battle, Castor killed Lynceus while Idas, at his brother's death, forgot both the strife and bride, and started to bury his brother. When he was placing the bones in a funeral monument, Castor intervened and tried to prevent his raising of the monument, because he had won over him as if he were a woman. In anger, Idas pierced the thigh of Castor with the sword he wore. Others say that, as he was building the monument he pushed it on Castor and thus killed him. When they reported this to Pollux, he rushed up and overcame Idas in a single fight, recovered the body of his brother, and buried it.

Apollodorus version 
A different tale was presented in the Bibliotheca, where the cause of the strife of the Aphareids and Disocuri was not the abduction of the Leucippides but the division of spoils between them. Castor and Pollux, having driven booty of cattle from Arcadia, in company with Idas and Lynceus, they allowed Idas to divide the spoil. He cut a cow in four and said that one half of the booty should be his who ate his share first, and that the rest should be his who ate his share second. And before they knew where they were, Idas had swallowed his own share first and likewise his brother's, and with him had driven off the captured cattle to Messene. But the Dioscuri marched against Messene, and drove away that cattle and much else besides. And they lay in wait for Idas and Lynceus. But Lynceus spied Castor and discovered him to Idas, who killed him. Pollux chased them and slew Lynceus by throwing his spear, but in pursuing Lynceus he was wounded in the head with a stone thrown by him, and fell down in a swoon. In revenge, the divine father of Pollux, Zeus, smote Idas with a thunderbolt and carried up his son to heaven where he shared his immortality with his mortal brother, Castor.

After the deaths of the two Messenian princes, the kingdom was bereft of male descendants and thus, Nestor, son of Neleus and a relative obtained the whole land including all the part ruled formerly by Idas, but not that subject (Tricca) to the sons of Asclepius, Machaon and Podalirius.

Other adventures 
Idas wished to rob Teuthras, king of Moesia, of his kingdom but was overcame in one battle by Telephus, son of Auge and Heracles, with the help of Parthenopaeus, son of Atalanta.

On their journey to fetch the Golden Fleece, Idas avenged the death of Idmon, son of Apollo by slaying the wild boar that wounded and killed the seer.

Notes

References 

 Apollodorus, The Library with an English Translation by Sir James George Frazer, F.B.A., F.R.S. in 2 Volumes, Cambridge, MA, Harvard University Press; London, William Heinemann Ltd. 1921. ISBN 0-674-99135-4. Online version at the Perseus Digital Library. Greek text available from the same website.
 Bacchylides, Odes translated by Diane Arnson Svarlien. 1991. Online version at the Perseus Digital Library.
 Bacchylides, The Poems and Fragments. Cambridge University Press. 1905. Greek text available at the Perseus Digital Library.
 Gaius Julius Hyginus, Fabulae from The Myths of Hyginus translated and edited by Mary Grant. University of Kansas Publications in Humanistic Studies. Online version at the Topos Text Project.
 Gaius Valerius Flaccus, Argonautica translated by Mozley, J H. Loeb Classical Library Volume 286. Cambridge, MA, Harvard University Press; London, William Heinemann Ltd. 1928. Online version at theio.com.
 Gaius Valerius Flaccus, Argonauticon. Otto Kramer. Leipzig. Teubner. 1913. Latin text available at the Perseus Digital Library.
 Homer, The Iliad with an English Translation by A.T. Murray, Ph.D. in two volumes. Cambridge, MA., Harvard University Press; London, William Heinemann, Ltd. 1924. . Online version at the Perseus Digital Library.
 Homer, Homeri Opera in five volumes. Oxford, Oxford University Press. 1920. . Greek text available at the Perseus Digital Library.
 Lucius Mestrius Plutarchus, Moralia with an English Translation by Frank Cole Babbitt. Cambridge, MA. Harvard University Press. London. William Heinemann Ltd. 1936. Online version at the Perseus Digital Library. Greek text available from the same website.
 Lucius Mestrius Plutarchus, Morals translated from the Greek by several hands. Corrected and revised by. William W. Goodwin, PH. D. Boston. Little, Brown, and Company. Cambridge. Press Of John Wilson and son. 1874. 5. Online version at the Perseus Digital Library.
 Pausanias, Description of Greece with an English Translation by W.H.S. Jones, Litt.D., and H.A. Ormerod, M.A., in 4 Volumes. Cambridge, MA, Harvard University Press; London, William Heinemann Ltd. 1918. . Online version at the Perseus Digital Library
 Pausanias, Graeciae Descriptio. 3 vols. Leipzig, Teubner. 1903.  Greek text available at the Perseus Digital Library.
 Publius Ovidius Naso, Metamorphoses translated by Brookes More (1859-1942). Boston, Cornhill Publishing Co. 1922. Online version at the Perseus Digital Library.
 Publius Ovidius Naso, Metamorphoses. Hugo Magnus. Gotha (Germany). Friedr. Andr. Perthes. 1892. Latin text available at the Perseus Digital Library.
 Publius Papinius Statius, The Thebaid translated by John Henry Mozley. Loeb Classical Library Volumes. Cambridge, MA, Harvard University Press; London, William Heinemann Ltd. 1928. Online version at the Topos Text Project.
 Publius Papinius Statius, The Thebaid. Vol I-II. John Henry Mozley. London: William Heinemann; New York: G.P. Putnam's Sons. 1928. Latin text available at the Perseus Digital Library.
 Sextus Propertius, Elegies from Charm. Vincent Katz. trans. Los Angeles. Sun & Moon Press. 1995. Online version at the Perseus Digital Library. Latin text available at the same website.

External links 
 http://www.classics.upenn.edu/myth/php/tools/dictionary.php?method=did&regexp=892&setcard=0&link=0&media=0
 http://oxfordindex.oup.com/view/10.1093/oi/authority.20110803095956462

Argonauts
Princes in Greek mythology
Characters in the Argonautica
Messenian characters in Greek mythology
Deeds of Apollo
Deeds of Zeus